Luis Núñez or Luis Nuñez may refer to:

 Luis Núñez (athlete) (born 1964), Dominican Republic athlete
 Luis Núñez (footballer, born May 1980), Paraguayan footballer for Sportivo Luqueño
 Luis Núñez (footballer, born 1983), Colombian footballer for Boyacá Chicó
 Luis Núñez Astrain (1931–2009), Spanish-Basque linguist and sociologist, editor of the newspaper Egin
 Luis Patricio Núñez (born January 1980), former Chilean footballer